Cembratrienol (CBTol) is a tertiary alcohol produced in the leaves of tobacco plants. It acts as an insect repellent.

History 
In 2018 researchers isolated the sections of the tobacco genome that produce CBTol molecules. They incorporated those genes into Escherichia coli bacteria. When fed wheat bran, those bacteria produced CBTol. The chemical was extracted via centrifugal separation chromatography and incorporated into a biodegradable, non-toxic and environmentally-friendly repellent that can be sprayed directly onto crops. In laboratory tests, aphids avoided treated crops. One side benefit was that it kills multiple types of gram-positive bacteria that are harmful to humans.

See also 
 Crop protection
 Pesticide
 Insecticide

References

External links 
 
 

Insect repellents
Tobacco
Cyclic compounds
Tertiary alcohols
Unsaturated compounds
Diterpenes